Pharus ecuadoricus is a species of grass in the family Poaceae. It is found only in Ecuador, where it grows in wet coastal forest habitat. There are only three known subpopulations.

References

ecuadoricus
Endemic flora of Ecuador
Endangered plants
Plants described in 1991
Taxonomy articles created by Polbot